The Delaware–William & Mary football rivalry  between the Delaware Fightin' Blue Hens and the William & Mary Tribe is a match-up between two public universities, the University of Delaware and the College of William and Mary, that are also members of the Colonial Athletic Association. Both schools have academic reputations that have labeled them as Public Ivies. Both schools are also Colonial Colleges having been founded before the United States became independent in 1776; the College of William and Mary was founded in 1693 and the University of Delaware's predecessor school was founded in 1743.

The football series began in 1915 and has been played a total of 44 times as of 2022.

History
Previously, the game has been a divisional game in the CAA South, and conference game in the Yankee Conference and Atlantic 10 beginning with the Tribe's entry in 1993. During this period, the two teams have combined for one National Championship (Delaware in 2003), two shared Conference Championships (2004 and 2010) and seven standalone conference titles (Delaware in 1995, 2000, 2003, and 2010 and William & Mary in 1996 and 2001). With the exception of the 1915 game held at Frazer Field, all of Delaware's home games have been hosted at Delaware Stadium in Newark, Delaware. William & Mary has hosted its contests at Zable Stadium in Williamsburg, Virginia; as of 2019, no games have been played on a neutral field.

Game results

See also  
 List of NCAA college football rivalry games

References

External links
 Hens-Tribe Rivalry Provides Its Thrills . The Daily Press. September 25, 2002.
 W&M-Delaware Rivalry Grows . The Daily Press. September 11, 1991.

College football rivalries in the United States
William & Mary Tribe football
Delaware Fightin' Blue Hens football